The Shams Abu Dhabi project will be developed on Reem Island in Abu Dhabi by Sorouh Real Estate and occupy approximately 25% of the island. It will occupy , of which 90% will be dedicated to residential buildings and has a potential of developing 22,000 residential units which will house around 100,000 people whereas the rest will be available for commercial use and recreational facilities.

The entrance will be marked by The Gate Shams Abu Dhabi, which consists of 8 buildings. It will be linked to mainland Abu Dhabi by two bridges. It was developed in numerous phases and the first phase was expected to be completed by 2009 and the whole project by 2011.

The Gate

It includes offices and residential complexes that are able to hold thousands of people.

The building resembles Marina Bay Sands in Singapore.

References

External links
Shams Abu Dhabi - Development Profile
 Shams Central Park and Landscape Development

Buildings and structures under construction in Abu Dhabi
Skyscrapers in Abu Dhabi
Gates in the United Arab Emirates